The 2013 CollegeInsider.com Postseason Tournament (CIT) was a postseason single-elimination tournament of 32 NCAA Division I teams. Games took place throughout March 2013. The semifinals were played on March 30 with the championship game played on April 2, 2013.

31 participants who are not invited to the 2013 NCAA tournament, the 2013 National Invitation Tournament, or the 2013 College Basketball Invitational made up the field, as well as the winner of the Great West conference tournament winner, Chicago State.

All games, except for the championship game, were streamed online through the CollegeInsider.com Game of the Week platform powered by NeuLion at watchcollegeinsider.com. Free registration was required to view the games. The championship game was broadcast by new partner CBS Sports Network.

The tournament was won by East Carolina who defeated Weber State in the championship game.

Participating teams
The following teams received an invitation to the 2013 CIT. The Great West Conference tournament champion, Chicago State, received an automatic bid.

Format
The fifth annual CIT will once again use the old NIT model in which matchups in future rounds will be determined by the results of the previous round.

Bracket
Bracket is for visual purposes only. The CIT does not have a set bracket.

Home teams are listed second.
* Denotes overtime period.

References

CollegeInsider.com
CollegeInsider.com Postseason Tournament